Cepora nerissa, the common gull, is a small to medium-sized butterfly of the family Pieridae, that is, the yellows and whites, which is native to Sri Lanka, India, China, southeast Asia, and Indonesia.

Description

Wet-season brood

Male upperside: white, a greyish-blue shade at base of the wings and along the veins, due to the dark markings on the underside that show through. Forewing: veins black; apex and termen black, the inner margin of that colour extended in an irregular curve from middle of costa to base of terminal third of vein 4, thence continued obliquely outwards to the tornal angle; interspaces 6 and 9 with short narrow greyish-white streaks of the ground colour that stretch into the black apical area but do not reach the margin; a short black subterminal bar between veins 3 and 4 and another, less clearly defined, between veins 1 and 2. Hindwing: veins 4 to 7 with outwardly dilated broad black edgings that coalesce sometimes and form an anterior, irregular, black, terminal margin to the wing. Underside, forewing: white, the veins broadly margined on both sides by dusky black; costal margin broadly and apex suffused with yellow; subterminal black bars between veins 1 and 2, and 3, and 4 as on the upperside but less clearly defined. Hindwing entirely suffused with yellow, the veins diffusely bordered with black; a more or less incomplete, subterminal series of dusky spots in interspaces 1 to 6; more often than not the spot in 5 entirely absent; a conspicuous chrome-yellow spot on the precostal area. Antennae black, obscurely speckled with white; head and thorax bluish grey; abdomen dusky black; beneath: the palpi and abdomen white, the thorax yellow.

Female similar to the male but very much darker. Upperside: veins more broadly bordered with black; in many specimens only the following portions of the white ground colour are apparent. Forewing: a broad streak in cell and beyond it a discal series of streaks in interspaces 1 to 6, 9, and 10; the streaks in interspaces 1 and 3 very broadly interrupted by the transverse black bars; that in 6 more or less obsolescent. Hindwing: a broad streak in cell, a discal series of streaks in interspaces 2 to 7, and a posterior more or less obsolescent subterminal series of greyish-white double spots. Underside similar to that of the male only the veins much more broadly margined with diffuse black scaling. Antennae, head, thorax and abdomen as in the male.

Dry-season brood

These differ from the wet-season brood as follows: male upperside, forewing: the apical and terminal black areas much restricted; veins concolorous; black subterminal bare less clearly defined; the lower one often obsolete. Hindwing: the black markings on the termen represented by short triangular irrorations (speckles) of black scales at the apices chiefly of the anterior veins. Underside: as in the wet-season specimens, but the yellow much paler and somewhat ochraceous in tint.

Female differs less from the wet-season female, but the black markings on both the upper and underside are narrower and less pronounced, and on the latter the yellow suffusion is paler and ochraceous in tint.

Distribution

Larva
"Cylindrical, tapering at the anal end; finely white-dotted, with a lower lateral white line. Feeds on Capparis." (Thwaites) Seems to prefer only Capparis zeylanica in Pune."

Larval Host Plants 

 Cadaba fruticosa
 Capparis baducca
 Capparis brevispina
 Capparis cleghornii
 Capparis decidua
 Capparis sepiaria
 Capparis zeylanica
 Crateva adansonii
 Maerua oblongifolia

Pupa

"Greenish; thorax and basal abdominal segment acutely angled." (de Nicéville MS)

Subspecies
Subspecies are:
C. n. cibyra (Fruhstorfer, 1910) (Taiwan)
C. n. coronis (Cramer, 1775) (China)
C. n. corva (Wallace, 1867) (Java)
C. n. dapha (Moore, 1879) (central Myanmar, eastern  Myanmar to Thailand, northern Peninsular Malaya, Langkawi)
C. n. dissimilis (Rotschild, 1892) (Bali)
C. n. evagete (Cramer, 1775) (Sri Lanka, S.India)
C. n. lichenosa (Moore, 1877) (Andamans)
C. n. nerissa (Fabricius, 1775) (northern Vietnam, southern China)
C. n. phryne (Fabricius, 1775) (northern India to western Burma)
C. n. physkon (Fruhstorfer, 1910) (Lombok)
C. n. sumatrana (Hagen, 1894) (Sumatra)
C. n. vaso (Doherty, 1891) (Sumbawa)
C. n. yunnanensis (Mell, 1951) (Yunnan)

Cepora lichenosa is treated as a full species by some authors.

See also
 List of butterflies of India (Pieridae)

References

Pierini
Butterflies of Asia
Butterflies of Indochina
Butterflies described in 1775
Taxa named by Johan Christian Fabricius